Alma Prica (born 17 September 1962) is a Croatian actress. She graduated from the Zagreb Academy of Drama Arts in 1985 and then joined the Croatian National Theatre in Zagreb (HNK Zagreb) in 1986. Although primarily a theatre actress, she also appeared in numerous film and television productions.

Prica received a number of awards throughout her career, including two Golden Arena for Best Actress awards - in 1993 for the portrayal of Dora Pejačević, alongside Rade Šerbedžija, in the biopic Kontesa Dora; and in 2003 for her role in Vinko Brešan's film Witnesses.

Selected filmography
My Uncle's Legacy (Život sa stricem, 1988)
Countess Dora (Kontesa Dora, 1993)
The Old Oak Blues (Srce nije u modi, 2000)
Witnesses (Svjedoci, 2003)
Halima's Path (Halimin put, 2012)
The Diary of Diana B. (Dnevnik Diane Budisavljević) (2019)

References

External links
 
 Alma Prica biography at the Croatian National Theatre in Zagreb official website 

1962 births
Living people
Actresses from Zagreb
Academy of Dramatic Art, University of Zagreb alumni
20th-century Croatian actresses
Golden Arena winners
21st-century Croatian actresses
Croatian stage actresses
Croatian film actresses
Croatian television actresses
Croatian people of Bosniak descent
Croatian people of Serbian descent